A Fendersmith is a person employed to clean and repair the metal fenders before fireplaces in mansions, fine estates, or castles. The person is usually also responsible for lighting and keeping the fire contained within the fireplace. 

Few fendersmiths exist today, but can be found in places like Windsor Castle and Buckingham Palace.

A bagpipe tune exists with the title "Salute to Willie the Royal Fendersmith". It has been said that this was "Written by P.M James Banks as a tribute to Willie, the elder brother of James and Alex Banks".

This tune was composed by Pipe Major James Banks MBE. in 1993 on the tragic death of his brother Willie who was the Fendersmith at Windsor Castle, the tune was much loved by HM Elizabeth II and was played at her internment at Windsor Castle,  2022   source James Banks

References

Obsolete occupations
Cleaning and maintenance occupations
Windsor Castle
Buckingham Palace